John N. Dowdall (born June 23, 1960) is an American golfer.

Dowdall was born in Shreveport, Louisiana. He played college golf at Northeast Louisiana University

Dowdall turned professional and played on the Ben Hogan Tour (now Nationwide Tour) and PGA Tour from 1990 to 1997. On the Ben Hogan Tour (1992, 1994–96), his best finish was a win at the 1992 Ben Hogan Hawkeye Open. On the PGA Tour (1990, 1993, 1997), his best finish was T-26 at the 1993 Shell Houston Open.

Dowdall was re-instated as an amateur.

Professional wins (1)

Ben Hogan Tour wins (1)

*Note: The 1992 Ben Hogan Hawkeye Open was shortened to 36 holes due to rain.

See also
1992 PGA Tour Qualifying School graduates
1996 PGA Tour Qualifying School graduates

References

External links

American male golfers
PGA Tour golfers
Golfers from Shreveport, Louisiana
University of Louisiana at Monroe alumni
Golfers from Houston
1960 births
Living people